is a railway station in Fukuchi, Fukuoka Prefecture, Japan. It is on the Ita Line, operated by the Heisei Chikuhō Railway. Trains arrive roughly every 30 minutes.

A nearby ophthalmology clinic, Harada Eye Clinic, purchased naming rights to the station.

Platforms

External links
Akaike Station (Heisei Chikuhō Railway website)

References

Railway stations in Fukuoka Prefecture
Railway stations in Japan opened in 1904
Heisei Chikuhō Railway Ita Line